June Huh (full name: June E Huh, ; born 1983) is an American mathematician who is currently a professor at Princeton University. Previously, he was a professor at Stanford University. He was awarded the Fields Medal in 2022 and a MacArthur Fellowship in 2022. He has been noted for the linkages that he has found between algebraic geometry and combinatorics.

Early life and education
Huh was born in Stanford, California while his parents were completing graduate school at Stanford University. He was raised in South Korea, where his family returned when he was approximately two years old. His father was a professor of statistics at Korea University, while his mother was a professor of Russian language at Seoul National University. Poor scores on elementary school tests convinced him to believe that he lacked the innate aptitude to excel in mathematics. He dropped out of high school to focus on writing poetry after becoming bored and exhausted by the routine of constantly studying during his youth. Because of this, he has been described as a late bloomer. Huh enrolled at Seoul National University (SNU) in 2002, but was initially unsettled. He initially aimed to become a science journalist and decided to major in physics and astronomy, but compiled a poor attendance record and had to repeat several courses that he initially failed.

Early in his studies he was mentored by Japanese Fields medalist mathematician Heisuke Hironaka, who went to Seoul National University as a visiting professor. Having failed several courses, Huh took an algebraic geometry course under Hironaka in his sixth year which focused on singularity theory and was based on Hironaka's current research rather than established teaching material. Huh credited the course with sparking his interest in research-level math. Huh then proceeded to complete a master's degree at Seoul National University, while frequently travelling to Japan with Hironaka and acting as his personal assistant. Due to his poor academic record as a undergraduate, Huh was rejected from all but one of the American universities that he applied to. He started his Ph.D. studies at the University of Illinois Urbana-Champaign in 2009, before transferring in 2011 to the University of Michigan, graduating in 2014 with a thesis written under the direction of Mircea Mustață at the age of 31. He was awarded the Sumner Byron Myers Prize for his PhD thesis.

Career
In 2009, during his PhD studies, Huh proved Read's conjecture about the unimodality of the coefficients of chromatic polynomials in the context of graph theory, which had been unresolved for more than 40 years. In joint work with Karim Adiprasito and Eric Katz, he resolved the Heron–Rota–Welsh conjecture on the log-concavity of the characteristic polynomial of matroids.

With Karim Adiprasito, he is one of five winners of the 2019 New Horizons Prize for Early-Career Achievement in Mathematics, associated with the Breakthrough Prize in Mathematics. He was a winner of Blavatnik Award for Young Scientists (U.S. Regional) in 2017. Huh was an invited speaker at the International Congress of Mathematicians in 2018 in Rio de Janeiro. In 2021, he received the Samsung Ho-Am Prize in Science for physics and mathematics.

Huh was awarded the 2022 Fields Medal for "bringing the ideas of Hodge theory to combinatorics, the proof of the Dowling–Wilson conjecture for geometric lattices, the proof of the Heron–Rota–Welsh conjecture for matroids, the development of the theory of Lorentzian polynomials, and the proof of the strong Mason conjecture".
He is the sixth recipient of East Asian ancestry and the first recipient of Korean ancestry of the esteemed prize.

Personal life
Huh is married to Kim Nayoung, whom he met through during his studies while attending Seoul National University. Kim graduated from Seoul National University with a doctorate in mathematics. The couple have two sons.

References

External links
 

1983 births
Living people
21st-century American mathematicians
Algebraic geometers
American academics of Korean descent
American expatriates in South Korea
Combinatorialists
Fields Medalists
Institute for Advanced Study visiting scholars
Mathematicians from California
MacArthur Fellows
People from Stanford, California
Princeton University faculty
Recipients of the Ho-Am Prize in Science
Seoul National University alumni
Stanford University Department of Mathematics faculty
University of Michigan alumni